The Lavender Menace or revolution was an informal group of lesbian radical feminists formed to protest the exclusion of lesbians and their issues from the feminist movement at the Second Congress to Unite Women in New York City on May 1, 1970.
Members included Karla Jay, Martha Shelley, Rita Mae Brown, Lois Hart, Barbara Love, Ellen Shumsky, Artemis March, Cynthia Funk, Linda Rhodes, Arlene Kushner, Ellen Broidy, and Michela Griffo, and were mostly members of the Gay Liberation Front (GLF) and the National Organization for Women (NOW).

Origins
The term "Lavender Menace" originated as a negative term for the association of lesbianism with the feminist movement, but it was later reclaimed as a positive term by lesbian feminists. The phrase "Lavender Menace" was reportedly first used in 1969 by Betty Friedan, president of The National Organization for Women (NOW), to describe the threat that she believed associations with lesbianism posed to NOW and the emerging women's movement. Friedan, and some other heterosexual feminists, worried that the association would hamstring feminists' ability to achieve serious political change, and that stereotypes of "mannish" and "man-hating" lesbians would provide an easy way to dismiss the movement. Under her direction, NOW attempted to distance itself from lesbian causes – including omitting the New York chapter of the Daughters of Bilitis from the list of sponsors of the First Congress to Unite Women in November 1969. Friedan's remarks and the decision to drop DOB from the sponsor list led lesbian feminist Rita Mae Brown to angrily resign her administrative job at NOW in February 1970 (Jay 137-138, Brownmiller 82). In a New York Times Magazine article on March 15, 1970, straight radical feminist Susan Brownmiller quoted Friedan's remarks about the "lavender menace," which Brownmiller took as an allusion to Cold War era "Red Menace" rhetoric, and dismissed Friedan's worries as "A lavender herring, perhaps, but no clear and present danger."

Brownmiller later said that when she wrote the article, she had intended to use a humorous quip to distance herself from Friedan's homophobia. However, some lesbian feminists, especially Michela Griffo, took her remarks as "a scathing put-down" and "evidence of Susan's homophobia or closet homosexuality—that is, that she was trying to distance herself from lesbians by insulting us" They felt that the quip dismissed lesbians as an insignificant part of the movement, or lesbian issues as unnecessary distractions from the important issues.

"The women's movement had coined the motto 'the personal is political,'" said Karla Jay, in the 2014 documentary She's Beautiful When She's Angry. "But when you were a lesbian and wanted to talk about lesbian relationships, as opposed to heterosexual relationships, they didn't want to hear about it."

Second Congress to Unite Women
Describing lesbian activist Rita Mae Brown, Karla Jay has said: "one thing that you were not going to tell Rita was to shut up." Brown suggested to her consciousness-raising group that lesbian radical feminists organize an action in response to Brownmiller's comments, and the public airing of Friedan's complaints. The group decided to target the Second Congress to Unite Women in New York City on May 1, 1970, which they noticed featured not a single open lesbian on the program (Jay 140). They planned a zap for the opening session of the Congress, which would use humor and nonviolent confrontation to raise awareness of lesbians and lesbian issues as vital parts to the emerging women's movement. They prepared a ten-paragraph manifesto entitled "The Woman-Identified Woman" and made T-shirts, dyed lavender and silkscreened with the words "Lavender Menace" for the entire group (Jay 140-142). They also created rose colored signs with slogans like "Women's Liberation IS A Lesbian Plot" and "You're Going To Love The Lavender Menace" written on them, which were then placed throughout the auditorium.

Karla Jay, one of the organizers and participants in the zap, describes what happened:

After the initial stunt, the "Menaces" passed out mimeographed copies of "The Woman-Identified Woman" and took the stage, where they explained how angry they were about the exclusion of lesbians from the conference and the women's movement as a whole. A few members of the planning committee tried to take back the stage and return to the original program, but gave up in the face of the resolute Menaces and the audience, who used applause and boos to show their support. The group and the audience then used the microphone for a spontaneous speak-out on lesbianism in the feminist movement, and several of the participants in the "zap" were invited to run workshops the next day on lesbian rights and homophobia (Jay 144). Straight and gay women from the congress joined an all-women's dance (a frequent organizing and social tool used by Gay Liberation Front men and women) (Brownmiller 98).

Effects
The "Lavender Menace" zap, and the publication of "The Woman-Identified Woman," are widely remembered as a turning-point in the second-wave feminist movement, and as a founding moment for lesbian feminism. After the zap, many of the organizers continued to meet, and decided to create a lasting organization to continue their activism, which they eventually decided to call the "Radicalesbians". At the next national conference of NOW, in September 1971, the delegates adopted a resolution recognizing lesbianism and lesbian rights as "a legitimate concern for feminism".

In 1999, Susan Brownmiller described the impact by writing that "Lesbians would be silent no longer in the women's movement" (98). Karla Jay described it in her memoirs as "the single most important action organized by lesbians who wanted the women's movement to acknowledge our presence and needs," and said that it "completely reshaped the relationship of lesbians to feminism for years to come" (137). "We felt as well," Jay wrote, "that the zap was only the first of many actions to come and that lesbian liberation was suddenly and unstoppably on the rise" (145).

See also

 LGBT rights in the United States
 List of LGBT rights organizations
 Transexual Menace

References

 Fitzsimons, Tim. "LGBTQ History Month: The Road to Americas First Gay Pride March." NBCNews.com, NBCUniversal News Group, 8 Oct. 2018, www.nbcnews.com/feature/nbc-out/lgbtq-history-month-road-america-s-first-gay-pride-march-n917096.
 Brownmiller, Susan (1999). In Our Time: Memoir of a Revolution.
 Jay, Karla (1999). Tales of the Lavender Menace: A Memoir of Liberation.
 Faderman, Lillian. The Gay Revolution: The Story of the Struggle. New York: Simon & Schuster, 2015.

External links
 Radical Lesbians at GLBTQ 
 The Woman-identified Woman by Radicalesbians
 Lavender Menace Action at NYC LGBT Historic Sites Project

History of women's rights in the United States
Lesbian feminist organizations
Lesbian history in the United States
Lesbian organizations in the United States
Defunct LGBT organizations based in New York City
LGBT political advocacy groups in the United States
Radical feminist organizations
1970 in LGBT history
1970 establishments in New York City
Organizations established in 1970
Women in New York City